Tim Hortons Field, nicknamed "The Donut Box", is a multi-purpose stadium in Hamilton, Ontario, Canada. Built as a replacement for Ivor Wynne Stadium, Tim Hortons Field is primarily used for Canadian football and soccer, and is the home of the Hamilton Tiger-Cats of the Canadian Football League and Forge FC of the Canadian Premier League. During the 2015 Pan American Games, it was referred to as CIBC Hamilton Pan Am Soccer Stadium. The stadium opened in September 2014, two months after its original anticipated completion date of June 30, 2014.

History

Stadium development
Initial plans for the stadium were for it to be a principal Pan American stadium for soccer and track and field/athletics events.  However, disputes between the Tiger-Cats owner, Bob Young, the organizers of the 2015 Pan American Games, and the City of Hamilton arose over the location of the stadium, among other things, including whether or not a running track should be built around the proposed stadium in Hamilton.

In 2012, the 2015 Pan-Am organizers indicated that, due to financial constraints, they would be shifting their focus toward venues and "clusters" that could be used for multiple events, which might eliminate the need for a new stadium that would be used only for soccer, and they proposed another stadium on the campus of York University, tentatively named York Athletics Stadium, to host the track and field events. That, coupled with a scheduling process that had soccer and rugby sevens events on different days (thus opening the possibility that Toronto's BMO Field, which would house the rugby sevens contests in 2015 might also be able to host the soccer contests), had the potential to put the Hamilton stadium project in jeopardy.  Nonetheless, the Hamilton stadium project went forward as planned.

In July 2013, it was announced that Tim Hortons, the international restaurant chain that originated in Hamilton some fifty years earlier, had acquired naming rights to the stadium.

Construction and opening

The new stadium was constructed in 2013 and into early-mid 2014 on the site of the former Ivor Wynne Stadium, which was demolished in the process, and it opened for Canadian Football League (CFL) football in late 2014.  The stadium currently seats approximately 24,000 spectators for Canadian football, with expansion potential to boost capacity to more than 40,000 seats for special events (such as hosting a Grey Cup contest) in the future. The design of the new stadium also increased the width of the field to accommodate soccer games by meeting FIFA's international standards for association football pitches; reoriented the playing field from east–west to a north–south orientation; increased the seat width and leg room/corridor space to make it one of the most spacious among Canadian sports venues; incorporated extensive wireless communications infrastructure and washroom facilities; as well as adding luxury boxes, and other modern amenities. The stadium field surface is FIFA- and CFL-approved artificial turf.

The CFL's Toronto Argonauts played two home games at Tim Hortons Field in 2015, due to clashes with the MLB's Toronto Blue Jays playoffs games. The stadium has also occasionally hosted special games for Hamilton's amateur football teams; the Hamilton Hurricanes of the Canadian Junior Football League played a game in the stadium in 2015 and the McMaster Marauders football team played its 2016 Labour Day contest at the field in a doubleheader with the Tiger-Cats. The Hurricanes returned to the field twice in 2017, the latter being its own Labour Day contest.

In January 2015, U Sports awarded Tim Hortons Field hosting rights to the 52nd and 53rd Vanier Cup, held in November 2016 and November 2017 respectively.

Forge FC, a new soccer team owned by the Tiger-Cats, have played at the stadium in the Canadian Premier League since 2019. During the 2019 season, Tim Hortons Field hosted the first ever CPL match in April, and the first ever CPL Finals match in October.

Notable sporting events hosted

Scheduled events

Construction issues 
Following the stadium opening in 2014 there had been numerous issues regarding the quality of the construction. The City of Hamilton subsequently spent upwards of $2.5 million in fixes and safety repairs including replacing rain-damaged television screens and faulty baby-changing tables, installing draft beer lines, improving ventilation, sealing leaky expansion joints and repairing faulty floor drains.

See also
List of Canadian Football League stadiums
List of Canadian Premier League stadiums
Venues of the 2015 Pan American and Parapan American Games

References

External links

Soccer venues in Ontario
Canadian Football League venues
Sports venues in Hamilton, Ontario
Venues of the 2015 Pan American Games
Rugby union stadiums in Ontario
Lacrosse venues
Hamilton Tiger-Cats
Tim Hortons
Canadian Premier League stadiums
Forge FC
Premier Lacrosse League venues
Canadian football venues in Ontario
Public–private partnership projects in Canada